The Graydon House is a historic residence in Greenville, Alabama.  The house was built in 1909, and typifies the southern Alabama vernacular house, with a hip roof and wrap-around porch.  A gabled dormer is centered on the façade, and the porch has slender columns with elaborate brackets.  Decorative woodwork continues inside, including Queen Anne fireplace mantels.

The house was listed on the National Register of Historic Places in 1986.

References

National Register of Historic Places in Butler County, Alabama
Houses on the National Register of Historic Places in Alabama
Houses completed in 1909
Houses in Butler County, Alabama